Sky Harbor Airport  was a privately owned, public use airport located one nautical mile (2 km) east of the central business district of Sultan, a city in Snohomish County, Washington, United States. It was decommissioned in 2018 and replaced with a housing development.

Facilities and aircraft 
Sky Harbor Airport covered an area of 20 acres (8 ha) at an elevation of 282 feet (86 m) above mean sea level. It had one runway designated 7/25 with a turf surface measuring 1,930 by 100 feet (588 x 30 m).

For the 12-month period ending July 30, 2012, the airport had 600 general aviation aircraft operations, an average of 50 per month. At that time there were three single-engine aircraft based at this airport.

References

External links 
 Sky Harbor (S86) at WSDOT Airport Directory
 Aerial image as of July 1990 from USGS The National Map

Airports in Snohomish County, Washington
Transportation buildings and structures in Snohomish County, Washington
Defunct airports in Washington (state)